is a 1934 Japanese silent drama film directed by Mikio Naruse, based on a newspaper serial by Komatsu Kitamura. It was Naruse's last silent film and his final film for the Shochiku studio.

Plot
Sugiko works as a waitress in a café in Tokyo's Ginza district. Her boyfriend Machio proposes to her, although his family has arranged a marriage with a woman from a wealthy family for him. She is also approached by Yukihiko, a talent scout for a film studio which is looking for a new star actress. When she steps onto the street absent-mindedly, she is hit by the car of Hiroshi, the heir of the Yamanouchi family. Machio sees her being taken away in Hiroshi's car, believing that she is dating Hiroshi and has decided against his proposal, and leaves town. Hiroshi starts dating Sugiko, despite his mother's and sister's objections against his liaison with a girl of lower class descent, but when he insists on marrying her, they eventually give in. Meanwhile, Sugiko's friend and colleague Kesako has successfully applied for the job at the film studio, which puts the relationship to her boyfriend Shinkichi to the test. Sugiko soon feels uncomfortable in her new home, and Hiroshi, unhappy with his family's overt reluctance to his wife, starts drinking frequently. After Sugiko leaves him, Hiroshi has a car accident and is hospitalised. At the hospital, Sugiko blames Hiroshi's mother and sister for never having accepted her. Hiroshi dies soon after, and Sugiko returns to her job in the Ginza café, reunited with Kesako and Shinkichi who quit the film studio.

Cast
 Setsuko Shinobu as Sugiko Shima
 Akio Isono as Koichi, Sugiko's brother
 Sozo Okada as Hiroshi Yamanouchi
 Nobuko Wakaba as Takako, Hiroshi's sister
 Fumiko Katsuragi as Hiroshi's mother
 Shin'ichi Himori as Shinkichi
 Chiyoko Katori as Kesako
 Ichirō Yūki as Machio Harada, Sugiko's boyfriend
 Yukiko Inoue as Yoshiko Hisayama
 Shōzaburō Abe as barman
 Chishū Ryū as Yukihiko Chiba
 Tomio Aoki as boy on the telephone
 Takeshi Sakamoto
 Kōji Mitsui as café customer

Release
Street Without End premiered in Japan on 26 April 1934. It was shown in the U.S. as part of a 25 films Naruse retrospective in 1985, organised by the Kawakita Memorial Film Institute and film scholar Audie Bock.

References

External links
 
 
 

1934 films
1934 drama films
Japanese black-and-white films
Japanese drama films
Japanese silent films
Films based on works by Japanese writers
Films directed by Mikio Naruse
Shochiku films
1930s Japanese-language films
Silent drama films